Amber Zhaoyang Wang is a high fashion model.

Career 
Zhaoyang born and raised in Luoyang, Henan, China. She moved to US for studies but dropped out of Wilkes University and came back to China and started Warrior Education, an English training agency in China and became its CEO at the age of 19. Later, she moved back to the United States to complete her degree from Penn State University in the communication of art and science.

She has been featured on the cover of publications including Glamour, Harper's Bazaar, L'Official and has appeared in Vanity Teen, NYFW model for China Vogue, China Fashion Cosmopolitan and GQ among others. Zhaoyang Wang was also featured on model.com

References

External links 
 

Chinese models
Year of birth missing (living people)
Living people
People from Luoyang